Kristen Renwick Monroe (born May 17, 1946) is an American political scientist, specializing in political psychology and ethics. Her work on altruism and moral choice is presented in a trilogy of award-winning books in which Monroe argues that our sense of self in relation to others sets and delineates the range of choice options we find available, not just morally but cognitively.

Monroe has taught at the University of British Columbia, New York University, SUNY at Stony Brook, and Princeton University. Most of her career has been at University of California, Irvine. Monroe is a Professor of political science and the Founder and Director of UCI’s Ethics Center.

Early life and education
Monroe was born on May 17, 1946 in Princeton, Illinois to Gertrude Awilda Renwick Monroe, a teacher, and James Oliver Monroe, Jr., a lawyer hearing war crimes in the Pacific. Monroe graduated with honors from Smith College, where she attended the University of Geneva and the Graduate Institute of International Studies in Geneva in her junior year. She did her graduate work at the University of Chicago, where she received her MA in International Relations (1970) and PhD in Political Science (1974), after studying with Susanne and Lloyd Rudolph, Joseph Cropsey, Duncan MacRae, and Robert Fogel. Monroe was a Killam post-doctoral Fellow at the University of British Columbia, specializing in econometrics and political economy.

Major works
The Heart of Altruism: Perceptions of a Common Humanity (1994) revealed the political significance and the psychological roots of altruism and focused attention on how political choices are constrained by identity. Monroe tested the major explanations of altruism through a narrative analysis of in-depth interviews with philanthropists, Carnegie Hero Commission recipients and rescuers of Jews during the Holocaust. By contrasting these cognitive portraits with those of entrepreneurs, Monroe used altruism as an analytical tool to reveal significant limitations in political theories predicated on the assumption that human nature is innately self-interested. Her empirically-grounded critique resulted in effective challenges to scholars, such as Gary Becker (Nobel laureate in Economics) and Richard Dawkins (author of The Selfish Gene), who—Monroe claimed—try to explain away altruism in order to protect disciplinary paradigms rooted in the principle of self-interest.

The Hand of Compassion: Portraits of Moral Choice during the Holocaust (2004) continued Monroe’s empirically-grounded analyses of political behavior. The Hand of Compassion created intricate cognitive portraits of rescuers of Jews during the Holocaust, portraits that illuminated identity’s ability to shape and constrain political choice. It advanced Monroe’s view of how an altruistic perspective creates a feeling of moral salience, the psychological process that transforms generalized sentiments of concern for others’ suffering into an imperative to help.

Ethics in an Age of Terror and Genocide: Identity and Moral Choice (2012)''' asked what causes genocide. In particular, why do some stand by, doing nothing, while others risk their lives to help the persecuted?  Interviews with bystanders, Nazis and rescuers of Jews during the Holocaust reveal how self-image and identity—especially the sense of self in relation to others—set and delineate our choice options, not just morally but cognitively. Monroe outlines how people establish a critical psychological relationship with others, classifying individuals in need as "people just like us" or reducing them to strangers perceived as different, threatening, or even beyond the boundaries of the community of concern.Ethics in an Age of Terror and Genocide explicated the psychological dehumanization that is a prerequisite for genocide. It developed a broader theory of moral choice, one applicable to other forms of ethnic, religious, racial, and sectarian prejudice, aggression, and violence. By taking issue with ethical theories – such as Kantian or Utilitarianism ethics – that explain moral action based primarily on rational deliberation, Monroe argues that identity is more fundamental than reasoning in our treatment of others.

Monroe’s work in this trilogy is credited with creating the microfoundations for the scientific study of ethics and for reinvigorating moral psychology as a field. Her other work explores issues of gender equality within academia, stem cell research, the development of empirical political theory, interdisciplinary work in social science, and how people keep their humanity during war.

Professional service
Monroe is the author or co-editor of 17 books and nearly 100 journal articles and book chapters. She served as President of The International Society of Political Psychology (2007-8) and as the Vice President of both the American Political Science Association and the Midwest Political Science Association. Currently, she is the Book Review Editor of Political Psychology. Monroe has served on the Editorial Boards of The Journal of Politics, Political Behavior, Journal of Theoretical Politics, Political Research Quarterly, International Journal of Politics, Culture and Society, and Political Psychology. A member of the UCI NSF Advance Grant, she currently serves on the NSF Advisory Board for the Advance Program PAID.

Awards and honors
Monroe was awarded the 2013 Nevitt Sanford Award for Professional Contributions to Psychology by the International Society of Political Psychology and was a 2012-2013 Fellow at the Radcliffe Institute for Advanced Study at Harvard University. She delivered the 2012 Raoul Wallenberg Centennial Lectures for the Swedish Ministry of Culture and the 2011 Ernie and Lucha Vogel Moral Courage Lecture for Principia College. In 2010 the American Political Science Association awarded Monroe the Ithiel De Sola Pool Award and Lectureship for Outstanding Work in Political Science and the Goodnow Award for Service to the Profession. UCI has awarded Monroe the 2010 Paul Silverman Award for Distinguished Work in Ethics and the 2008 UCI Faculty Senate Award for Distinguished Research.

Publications
 The Political Process and Economic Change (Editor). New York: Agathon Press, 1983. 
 The Economic Approach to Politics: A Critical Reassessment of the Theory of Rational Action. (Editor). New York: HarperCollins, 1991. 
 Political Economy and Political Psychology. (Editor) Special edition of Political Psychology. 16, 1 (March 1995).
 The Heart of Altruism: Perceptions of a Common Humanity. Princeton: Princeton University Press, 1996. 
 Contemporary Empirical Political Theory. (Editor) Berkeley, CA: University of California Press, 1997. 
 Political Psychology (Editor). Hillsdale, NJ: Lawrence Erlbaum, November 2002. 
 The Hand of Compassion: Portraits of Moral Choice during the Holocaust. 2004. Princeton, NJ: Princeton University Press. 
 Perestroika! The Raucous Revolution in Political Science. (Editor). New Haven, CT: Yale University Press, 2005. 
 Fundamentals of the Stem Cell Debate: The Scientific, Religious, Ethical, and Political Issues. Co-edited with Ronald B. Miller and Jerome Tobis. University of California Press, in press 2007. 
 On Behalf of Others: The Psychology of Benevolence in a Global World. Edited volume with C.Kinnvall and Sarah Scuzzarello. Oxford U Press. 2009.
 Ethics in an Age of Terror and Genocide: Identity, Political Psychology and Moral Choice. Princeton U Press. 2012.
 Science, Ethics, and Politics: Conversations and Investigations. Edited volume with chapters by Francisco Ayala, Kenneth Arrow, Warren S. Brown, William Chiu, Joe DiMento, Gil Geis, Peter Hawkins Jennifer Hochschild, Cheryl Koopman, Nicholas Lampros, Chloe Lampros-Monroe, Adam Martin, Rose McDermott, Kristen Renwick Monroe, Gregory Peterson, Bridgette Portman, Thomas Schelling, Michael Spezio, Kevin Reimer, James Van Slyke, and Nicole Wernimont. Paradigm Press. 2011.
 "On Ethics and Economics: Conversations with Kenneth Arrow." With Kenneth Arrow and Nicholas Lampros. Paradigm Press. Foreword by Amatrya Sen. In press Paradigm Press.
 "A Darkling Plain: Humanity during War." In press, Cambridge University Press. With Chloe Lampros-Monroe and Jonah Pellecchia and the assistance of Sif Heide-Ottosen, Shant Setrak Meguerditchian, and Students in Political Science 149C, Fall 2010.
 Interdisciplinarity: Its Role in a Discipline-based Academy.'' In press, Oxford University Press. With Robert Alexrod, John Aldrich, Lisa Andersen, Karen Beckwith, and Matthew Moen.

References

External links
 Interdisciplinary Center for the Scientific Study of Ethics and Morality 

1946 births
Living people
Graduate Institute of International and Development Studies alumni
University of California, Irvine faculty
American women political scientists
American political scientists
American expatriates in Switzerland
21st-century American women